The Metropolitan Mayor of Quito is the head of the executive branch of the Metropolitan District of Quito, and is the highest-ranking official on the Council of the Metropolitan Municipal District of Quito, which is the chief legislative body of the city and canton.  The Council consists of the mayor and 15 other council members, each of whom is elected to their position by a general election of the people of Quito for a term of four years.  Members may be re-elected.

Mayor 
The mayor is Santiago Guarderas Izquierdo, who by succession took office on September 30, 2021, after the removal of Jorge Yunda from office by Quito city council members troubled by a lack of transparency while investigating suspected municipal spending malfeasance.

History of the office 

In Quito the first use of the title of mayor, or alcalde in Spanish, was established in 1946. Since then, 24 men have held the position with an average time in office of just over 3 years.  

Prior to 1946, and dating back to the mid-18th century, the chief executive was known only as President of the Metropolitan Council of Quito.

In 1993 under the administration of Mayor Jamil Mahuad, the title was re-named to "Metropolitan Mayor" due to the enactment of the Regime Law for the Metropolitan District of Quito.

List of mayors of Quito

References

External links 
Listing of Quito Council Members 

Quito
Quito